Sidhu Moose Wala was an Indian Punjabi singer, rapper, songwriter and actor associated with Punjabi music and films, who has released three studio albums, one extended play and sixty-three singles as  Albums Chart . Six of his singles have featured on the global YouTube music charts, while ten have featured on the UK Asian music chart published by Official Charts Company.

Studio albums

Extended plays

Singles

As lead artist

As featured artist

Soundtrack contributions

Soundtrack albums

Soundtrack singles

Songwriting discography

As executive producer 
 Songs of other artists released under Moose Wala's record label

See Also 
Sidhu Moose Wala videography

Notes

References 

Discographies of Indian artists
Hip hop discographies